Canyon Fire may refer to:
 Canyon Fire (2007), a 2007 wildfire in Los Angeles County, California
 Canyon Fire (2016), a 2016 wildfire on Vandenberg Air Force Base in Santa Barbara County, California
 Canyon Fire 2 a 2017 wildfire in Anaheim Hills, California